Etihad Airways operates a fleet of both narrow body and widebody aircraft from four aircraft families Airbus A320 family, Airbus A350-1000, Boeing 777 and Boeing 787 Dreamliner totaling 85 aircraft as of 1 August 2022.

Current fleet
, the Etihad fleet consists of the following aircraft.

Gallery

Historical fleet
Etihad Airways operated the following aircraft in the past:

References

 
Etihad Airways
Lists of aircraft by operator